The Colne Valley Viaduct is a bridge, under construction as of 2023, which will carry the High Speed 2 railway over the Colne Valley Regional Park and the Grand Union Canal, in Hillingdon, west London. It is one of the largest single civil engineering works of HS2 Phase 1.

A contract for the section of the railway pertaining to the viaduct was awarded during 2017 and the design concept was released to the public on 19 January 2018. Preparatory work commenced shortly thereafter, including a compulsory land purchase and the establishment of temporary facilities, including a factory, onsite. Construction of the viaduct commenced during March 2021 with completion of the main deck due to occur during 2024 with full completion expected for May 2025. Protestors have occasionally occupied the site, and allegations over the viaduct's aesthetic and environmental impact upon the area have been made.

History
Various means for High Speed 2 to traverse the valley of the River Colne were considered. One option which was studied as an alternative to using a viaduct was the extension of the nearby Northolt tunnel, which was also being built for the new line, however this option was dismissed in a report released in February 2015 due to the increased costs and construction time that would be involved. During 2017, Contract C1 (Central 1), which covers the 21.6 km section of the line that the viaduct falls within, was awarded to the Align JV joint venture, comprising Bouygues Travaux Publics, Sir Robert McAlpine and VolkerFitzpatrick.

On 19 January 2018, the design concept for the Colne Valley Viaduct, which was created by Knight Architects and Atkins, was unveiled by the British Government. This concept was produced in consultation with the Colne Valley Regional Park Panel. Additional work on the viaduct's design has also been undertaken by Grimshaw Architects.

In April 2019, Buckinghamshire County Council requested that the government pause all preparatory work until the Oakervee Review had been completed and disagreed with HS2 Limited over mitigation works. During March 2021, Hillingdon Council and HS2 Limited came to an agreement in which, in light of written assurances from the latter, the former shall not pursue a judicial review into the scheme. Shortly following this decision, full planning permission for the viaduct was secured.

Design
The Colne Valley Viaduct is intended to be a major civil engineering work of High Speed 2, being amongst the largest and perhaps the most prominent single feature to be constructed during Phase 1.

Considerable attention has been directed to the viaduct's aesthetic design and to avoid unnecessarily impacting the surrounding landscape and local community. The design of the overhead electrification equipment was also bespoke to reduce its visual impact. The exterior concrete surfaces are faceted to provide a more attractive visual and tactile design. However, the viaduct has been subject to criticism from Stop HS2 for ignoring the needs of local residents. Rail industry periodical Rail Engineer notes that the site of the viaduct features multiple factors of sensitivity, pertaining to both environmental and public interests, as well as access issues during the construction phase.

The main deck of the viaduct is to be manufactured at a nearby temporary factory, the assembly of which is to commence from the northern end. In total, 908 deck units and 92 pier head units will be produced; weighing between 60 and 140tonnes, each one unique to its intended place in the overall structure. Assembly will use a match-casting technique with relatively tight tolerance, supported by an adjustable steel formwork and prefabricated steel reinforcement where relevant. While two deck units are to be typically cast each day, the more complex pier head units will each require three days to complete. To appropriately handle rail braking loads, a total of four shock absorber units are to be integrated into the deck structure of the viaduct. The structure will also feature four expansion joints. The foundations will consist of driven piles upon which the faceted framework is installed; water-based piers are considerably more complex in shape and design.

Construction

As early as 2018, protestors had taken up positions in the Colne Valley to voice their objections to the project. In April 2019, 12 Extinction Rebellion protesters began treesitting in order to prevent HS2 Limited chopping down trees as part of preparatory works at Harvil Road, near to the proposed site of the viaduct. There had been a protest camp next to the road since October 2017, which HS2 began evicting in January 2020.

In order to clear the viaduct's intended path, a farmhouse was compulsory purchased while a watersports centre was required to relocate. Both properties are to be demolished. Various preparatory works were also undertaken during the 2010s, including the diversion of water mains, the realignment of 275kVa overhead power line, and a reinforcement of a gas mains, along with other measures. Towards the northern end of the viaduct, a temporary construction compound has been assembled, which accommodates offices, plant, employee welfare facilities, and the pre-cast factories for the project.

Progress
During March 2021, construction of the viaduct's foundations commenced, although test piling had occurred before this. Between spring and summer 2021, an internal access road was built, while the onsite factory building the viaduct segments were commissioned during the autumn. During spring 2022, deck construction commencend from the northern embankment.

In December 2021, the first  pier for the viaduct was cast. Construction of four jetties across the lake was also completed to support work on the piers that will be built in the water. In June 2022, the bridge building machine was launched. By December 2022, 125 of the 1,000 bridge segments had been placed in their final position.

References

External links

Railway viaducts in Buckinghamshire
Bridges under construction
Concrete bridges in the United Kingdom
High Speed 2